Billy Steuart (born 28 August 1936) was a South African former swimmer. He competed in three events at the 1956 Summer Olympics. He finished third in the 4 x 220 yards freestyle relay (with Dennis Ford, Graham Johnston, and Peter Duncan), fourth in the 1650 yards freestyle and sixth in the 440 yards freestyle at the 1954 British Empire and Commonwealth Games.

References

External links
 

1936 births
Living people
South African male swimmers
Olympic swimmers of South Africa
Swimmers at the 1956 Summer Olympics
Swimmers at the 1954 British Empire and Commonwealth Games
Commonwealth Games bronze medallists for South Africa
Commonwealth Games medallists in swimming
Place of birth missing (living people)
South African male freestyle swimmers
20th-century South African people
21st-century South African people
Medallists at the 1954 British Empire and Commonwealth Games